The Princess Louise is a public house situated on High Holborn, a street in central London. Built in 1872, it is best known for its well-preserved 1891 Victorian interior, with wood panelling and a series of booths around an island bar. It is a tied house owned by the Samuel Smith Brewery of Tadcaster, Yorkshire.

About
Being located near Bloomsbury, the British Museum and the University of London, it is patronised by academics.

Building
The building is protected by its Grade II* listing and has what has been described as "a rich example of a Victorian public house interior", by William B Simpson and Sons; who contracted out the work. As it is considered so historically significant even the men's toilets, with their marble urinals, are listed. The pub, which is also listed on National Inventory of Historic Pub Interiors, was refurbished in 2007. The pub is unusual in that it retains its snob screens.

In June 2009, the pub was joint winner of the best refurbishment class of the 2008 Pub Design Awards awarded annually by CAMRA. Author Peter Haydon included the Princess Louise in his book The Best Pubs in London and rated it No. 5 in the capital, saying it had "possibly the best preserved Victorian pub interior in London".

History
The pub was operated by Regent Inns from 1990 until 1998, when the lease was taken over by Samuel Smith.

The Princess Louise is also notable for having been the venue for a number of influential folk clubs run by Ewan MacColl and others, which played an important part in the British folk revival of the late 1950s and early 1960s.

Gallery

References

External links

CAMRA National Inventory of Historic Pub Interiors
 Beer in the Evening
 pubs.com review

National Inventory Pubs
Grade II* listed pubs in London
Commercial buildings completed in 1872
Buildings and structures in Holborn
19th-century architecture in the United Kingdom
Pubs in the London Borough of Camden
Grade II* listed buildings in the London Borough of Camden